Local elections were held in Denmark on 18 November 1997. 4685 municipal council members were elected to the 1998–2001 term of office in the 275 municipalities, as well as members of the 14 counties of Denmark.

Results of regional elections
The results of the regional elections:

County Councils
Ministry of interior informed that voter turnout was 71.4%.

Municipal Councils
Ministry of interior informed that voter turnout was 70.1%.

References

1997
1997 elections in Denmark
November 1997 events in Europe